GBH may refer to:
 GBH (design and advertising agency), a London-based design and advertising agency
 Grievous bodily harm, a term used in English criminal law
 Glyphosate-based herbicide
 Union of Construction and Woodworkers, an Austrian trade union

In arts, entertainment and media:
 GBH (band), an English punk band 
 GBH, trade name of the WGBH Educational Foundation and some of its public media outlets, including GBH 2 (WGBH-TV) and GBH 44 (WGBX-TV)
 G.B.H. (TV series), a seven-part British television drama shown in the summer of 1991 on Channel 4
 G.B.H. (soundtrack), the soundtrack album by Elvis Costello and Richard Harvey for the series
The Grand Budapest Hotel, a 2014 film by Wes Anderson
The Grand Budapest Hotel (soundtrack), the soundtrack by Alexandre Desplat for the film
 Great Bash Heel, a professional wrestling stable
 GBH, a 1980 novel by Ted Lewis

See also
 GHB